Simulated racing or racing simulation, commonly known as simply sim racing, are the collective terms for racing game software that attempts to accurately simulate auto racing, complete with real-world variables such as fuel usage, damage, tire wear and grip, and suspension settings. To be competitive in sim racing, a driver must understand all aspects of car handling that make real-world racing so difficult, such as threshold braking, how to maintain control of a car as the tires lose traction, and how properly to enter and exit a turn without sacrificing speed. It is this level of difficulty that distinguishes sim racing from arcade racing-style driving games where real-world variables are taken out of the equation and the principal objective is to create a sense of speed as opposed to a sense of realism.Due to the complexity and demands of mimicking real-life driving, racing sims require faster computers to run effectively, as well as a  steering wheel and pedals for the throttle and brakes  for the immersion.

While using a simple gamepad, joystick or even a mouse and keyboard may suffice for most arcade-style driving games on home systems, it won't provide the same level of immersion and realism as using a racing wheel and pedals. In recent years, many sim racing experiences have been developed for consoles, such as the PlayStation and Xbox. While these games can be played with a controller, it is recommended that players invest in a racing wheel and pedals. With the development of online racing, the ability to drive against human opponents and computer AI offline is the closest many will come to driving cars on a real track. Even those who race in real-world competition use simulations for practice or for entertainment. With continued development of the physics engine software that forms the basis of these sims, as well as improved hardware (providing tactile feedback), the experience has become more realistic.

In general, sim racing gameplay style applied in several video games like iRacing, Assetto Corsa and Assetto Corsa Competizione, Gran Turismo, among others.

History of sim racing

Arcade simulator era (1982–1989)
Prior to the division between arcade-style racing and sim racing, the earliest attempts at providing driving simulation experiences were arcade racing video games, dating back to Pole Position, a 1982 arcade game developed by Namco, which the game's publisher Atari publicized for its "unbelievable driving realism" in providing a Formula 1 experience behind a racing wheel at the time. It featured other AI cars to race against, crashes caused by collisions with other vehicles and roadside signs, and introduced a qualifying lap concept where the player needs to complete a time trial before they can compete in Grand Prix races. It also pioneered the third-person rear-view perspective used in most racing games since then, with the track's vanishing point swaying side to side as the player approaches corners, accurately simulating forward movement into the distance. In a 2007 retrospective review, Eurogamer called it "a simulation down to the core: those dedicated will eventually reap success but most will be deterred by the difficulty".

Pole Position II was released in 1983 and featured several improvements like giving the player the choice of different race courses. TX-1, developed by Tatsumi in 1983, was licensed to Namco, who in turn licensed it to Atari in America, thus the game is considered a successor to Pole Position II. TX-1, however, placed a greater emphasis on realism, with details such as forcing players to brake or downshift the gear during corners to avoid the risk of losing control, and let go of the accelerator when going into a skid in order to regain control of the steering. It also used force feedback technology, which caused the steering wheel to vibrate, and the game also featured a unique three-screen arcade display for a more three-dimensional perspective of the track. It also introduced nonlinear gameplay by allowing players to choose which path to drive through after each checkpoint, eventually leading to one of eight possible final destinations.

Since the mid-1980s, it became a trend for arcade racing games to use hydraulic motion simulator arcade cabinets. The trend was sparked by Sega's "taikan" games, with "taikan" meaning "body sensation" in Japanese. The "taikan" trend began when Yu Suzuki's team at Sega (later known as Sega AM2) developed Hang-On (1985), a racing video game where the player sits on and moves a motorbike replica to control the in-game actions. Hang-On was a popular Grand Prix style rear-view motorbike racer, was considered the first full-body-experience video game, and was regarded as the first motorbike simulator for its realism at the time, in both the handling of the player's motorbike and the AI of the computer-controlled motorcyclists. It used force feedback technology and was also one of the first arcade games to use 16-bit graphics and Sega's "Super Scaler" technology that allowed pseudo-3D sprite-scaling at high frame rates. Suzuki's team at Sega followed it with hydraulic motion simulator cabinets for later racing games, such as Out Run in 1986.                         

In 1986, Konami released WEC Le Mans, an early car driving simulator based on the 24 Hours of Le Mans. It attempted to realistically simulate car driving, with the car jumping up and down, turning back and forth, and spinning up to 180 degrees, with an emphasis on acceleration, braking, and gear shifting, along with the need for counter-steering to avoid spin-outs. It also featured a day-night cycle, accurately simulated courses approved by the Automobile Club de l'Ouest, and force feedback to simulate road vibration in the form of a vibrating steering wheel that reacts to the driver's acceleration and off-road bumps.

The first racing game with simulation pretensions on a home system is believed to have been Chequered Flag, released by Psion on the 8-bit ZX Spectrum in 1983. REVS, followed in 1986. REVS was a Formula 3 sim that delivered a semi-realistic driving experience by Geoff Crammond that ran on the Commodore 64 and BBC. REVS had a big fan base in England, but not so much in the United States.

3D polygon graphics appeared in arcade racing simulators with Namco's Winning Run (1988) and Atari's Hard Drivin' (1989), the latter also becoming a staple on home computers, where it was one of the most widely played simulators up to that point.

During the late 1980s to early 1990s, arcade racing games such as Out Run and Virtua Racing (1992) had increasingly elaborate, hydraulic motion simulator arcade cabinets, with arcade racers such as Virtua Racing and Daytona USA (1993) increasingly focused on simulating the speed and thrills of racing. At the same time, arcade racing games gradually moved away from the more difficult simulation style of Pole Position. By the early 1990s, arcade racing games had less emphasis on realistic handling or physics, and more emphasis on fast-paced action, speed and thrills.

Emergence of sim racing genre (1989–1997)
Sim racing is generally acknowledged to have really taken off in 1989 with the introduction of Papyrus Design Group's Indianapolis 500: The Simulation, designed by David Kaemmer and Omar Khudari on 16-bit computer hardware. The game is often generally regarded as the personal computer's first true auto racing simulation. Unlike most other racing games at the time, Indianapolis 500 attempted to simulate realistic physics and telemetry, such as its portrayal of the relationship between the four contact patches and the pavement, as well as the loss of grip when making a high-speed turn, forcing the player to adopt a proper racing line and believable throttle-to-brake interaction. It also featured a garage facility to allow players to enact modifications to their vehicle, including adjustments to the tires, shocks and wings. With Indy 500, players could race the full , where even a blowout after  would take the player out of the competition. The simulation sold over 200,000 copies. It was around this time that sim racing began distinguishing itself from arcade-style racing.

Consoles saw the release of Human Entertainment's Fastest 1 for the Sega Mega Drive/Genesis in 1991. It was considered the most realistic Formula 1 racing simulation up until that time.

In 1991, Namco released the arcade game Mitsubishi Driving Simulator, co-developed with Mitsubishi. It was a serious educational street driving simulator that used 3D polygon technology and a sit-down arcade cabinet to simulate realistic driving, including basics such as ensuring the car is in neutral or parking position, starting the engine, placing the car into gear, releasing the hand-brake, and then driving. The player can choose from three routes while following instructions, avoiding collisions with other vehicles or pedestrians, and waiting at traffic lights; the brakes are accurately simulated, with the car creeping forward after taking the foot off the brake until the hand-brake is applied. Leisure Line magazine considered it the "hit of the show" upon its debut at the 1991 JAMMA show.

The next major milestone was the 1992 release of Formula One Grand Prix (AKA World Circuit in some markets) by MicroProse, also developed by Geoff Crammond. This moved the genre along significantly. Multiplayer was made possible by allowing different drivers to take turns, and racers could also hook up their machines for racing via a null modem cable. This only allowed two drivers to race. Leagues emerged where drivers would submit records of their single player races to compare with other drivers. This is the first sim in which drafting/slip streaming was possible.

Papyrus followed up Indy 500 with IndyCar Racing in 1993 and F1GP was surpassed in all areas. Papyrus later released more tracks and a final expansion included the Indianapolis track plus a paintkit. Now drivers could easily customize their cars. IndyCar Racing sold around 300,000 copies.

The first variant of Papyrus' NASCAR Racing series was launched in 1994. In SVGA (640×480) it pushed the PCs of the time to the limit. Suddenly a resolution of 320×200 seemed a poor option and NASCAR Racing was the race sim of choice for anyone with a capable PC, particularly in North America. It was the first sim where cars no longer looked like boxes. It keyed in on sophisticated physics modeling. NASCAR Racing sold over one million units. Moreover, the first real online racing started with NASCAR Racing using the "Hawaii" dial-in servers and it was not uncommon for these early sim racers to have $300 to $1500 phone bills. Online racing had seen its first true realization, and to many, this was the dawn of "real" sim racing.

1995 saw the release of IndyCar Racing II, updating the first version with the new NASCAR graphics engine. A year later, MicroProse released the successor to F1GP, Grand Prix 2, to much anticipation. GP2 became successful not just because of its detailed and thorough simulation of the 1994 Formula 1 season, but also because it was customizable; this was achievable by way of the online community. Players could change everything about the game: drivers, teams, graphics, physics, car shapes, and eventually even the racetracks. Offline leagues reached their peak with GP2 in 1998.

In 1996, NASCAR Racing 2 was released, further improving the original, and the number of sim racers exploded. The TEN multiplayer hosting service was introduced and went live in November 1997 with the backing of NASCAR and the online sim racing community grew.

In 1997, Gran Turismo was released for the PlayStation. It was considered the most realistic racing simulation for consoles at the time, featuring a wealth of meticulous tuning options and an open-ended career mode where players had to undertake driving tests to acquire driving licenses, earn their way into races and choose their own career path. It introduced the racing simulation genre to home consoles, becoming the basis for all modern racing simulations on video game consoles.

Graphics accelerator era (1997–2002)
Graphics accelerator cards brought a new level of realism to the graphics and physics of sim racing games. These new graphics processing units provided texture mapping, antialiasing, particle effects (i.e. fog, rain and snow), HDR and the capability to perform polygonal calculations faster, while taking the load off of the main processor. F1 Racing Simulation by Ubisoft, was among the first to utilize the new technology in 1997.

After years of development, Microprose released Grand Prix 3, which used a more modern graphics engine and featured the same customizable structure of GP2. However, GP3 was not as well received as its predecessor due to a lack of full online multiplayer and the fact it was based on the same, outdated graphics engine as GP2. However, because of the graphical and physical similarities between the two games, the game was popular with modders who were able to port mod tracks and cars directly into GP3.

Another milestone in sim racing came in 1998 with the release of Papyrus’ Grand Prix Legends, which was based on 1967 F1 season. It was hailed as outstanding in all areas, especially in its physics and sound design. For many players, their first real experience of sim racing was through GPL or one of its many derivatives, such as NASCAR Racing 2003. The release of a groundbreaking third-party add-on for GPL, VROC (Virtual Racers Online Connection), allowed players to join together online and race in leagues.

Despite its age, GPL has remained a common benchmark for Racing Sims even in the modern era thanks to a strong community who continue creating new content for the game to this very day. Modding teams even managed to further improve on the game's physics and create third-Party expansions for following seasons, such as the 1969 season.

Wired magazine wrote an in-depth article about racing sims called Hard Drive in their February 1997 issue. In 1997, TORCS was released. Uniquely for Racing Sims, it was open source, making it even easier for modding teams to add new features and even create whole new games (Such as the TORCS-Based Speed Dreams)

Sega AM2's 1999 arcade game Ferrari F355 Challenge, later ported to the Dreamcast in 2000, was considered the most accurate simulation of the Ferrari F355 possible up until that time; its focus on realism was considered unusual for an arcade game at the time.

Since Grand Prix Legends, its publisher Image Space Incorporated has produced its own sims such as Sports Car GT in 1999 and the officially-licensed F1 series starting in 2000, all published by Electronic Arts. Unlike the Papyrus sims, the physics are easily modified, and many communities have been founded with the sole purpose of improving and updating MotorEngine-based games. One such community, Simbin, have created their own company and have released several games themselves, including GTR – FIA GT Racing Game, GT Legends, GTR 2, RACE – The Official WTCC Game, RACE 07, STCC – The Game, GTR Evolution, Race On and the Free-to-Play RaceRoom Racing Experience.

Further developments (2003–present)
In 2003, a 3-man team began developing Live for Speed. Phase 2 brought in many updates, including the first real cars (the BMW Sauber F1 car being included in those). The third phase of the content release cycle was launched in 2015, announcing the VW Scirocco and featuring the first real-world circuit, the Rockingham Motor Speedway.

In 2004, rally fans received the first true rally sim with Richard Burns Rally, which to this day is still recognised by its community as the best rally sim available. Much like most sims from the graphic accelerator and modern era, the game is highly modifiable and has many third-party mods that introduce anything from new cars to new physics.

In 2005, Image Space Incorporated released rFactor, a highly modifiable sim based on their Motor2 physics engine. Notable for its initial download-only distribution model, rFactor originally released with fictional cars and tracks. Thanks to its enthusiastic and ongoing modding community, the game has remained as one of the best racing sims around.

In 2006, SimBin Studios released GTR 2 (itself a sequel to GTR – FIA GT Racing Game), a sports car racing simulator developed with input from the actual racing teams which took part in the FIA GT 2003 / 2004 seasons (FIA GT Championship). It has received widespread acclaim and has been noted for its high levels of technical and driving realism with regards to sports car racing.

In 2006, Kunos Simulazioni released netKar Pro, a new version of netKar which aimed to bring together highly accurate physics and sound modeling as well as DirectX 9 graphics. Development tools for modifying NKP were announced, although the game is now considered obsolete due to the release company’s other sim, Assetto Corsa.

In 2008, David Kaemmer, co-founder of the now-defunct Papyrus, released iRacing, a multiplayer-oriented simulator run on a subscription model.

In 2010, Kunos Simulazioni started developing Assetto Corsa, a sim built on experience gained from netKar Pro and Ferrari Virtual Academy but with an entirely new engine. The new engine was designed to provide extensive and detailed tools for modding, allowing players to create highly detailed content with minimal effort. It was released on Windows through Steam's Early Access program in November 2013, with the full version releasing in December 2014.

In 2012, ISI launched the open beta of rFactor2. It went out of beta in 2013 mostly unfinished, and was met with backlash from players. In 2016 however Studio 397 took over development of rFactor2 with the aim to revamp and revive the title, making huge efforts to bring the series back to its prime with extensive customisation and detailed physics.

In 2013, Sector3 Studios (formerly SimBin) released RaceRoom, a free-to-play simulator for Microsoft Windows. Around this time, Eugene Cojocar of Exotypos also released X Motor Racing. Also in 2013, the first direct-drive wheel was released commercially.

In 2015, Slightly Mad Studios launched Project CARS for Windows, PlayStation 4 and Xbox One. The game was unique in that it was Crowdfunded, CARS standing for Community Assisted Racing Simulator.

In 2016, Brazil's Reiza Studios released Automobilista, a racing simulator featuring, among others, Formula Truck racing, Rallycross and some lesser known Brazilian racing classes. The game was based on their well-known Stock Car Extreme, which was again based on the ISI Motor2 Engine.

In 2017, Project CARS 2 was launched by Slightly Mad Studios. It was the successor to Project CARS and used suggestions from the community to help improve upon the previous version, introducing features such as Rallycross, improved graphics and more.

In May 2019, Kunos Simulazioni launched Assetto Corsa Competizione, the spiritual successor to their wildly successful Assetto Corsa. The game aims to provide an accurate simulation of GT3 Racing and uses the official license for the Blancpain GT Endurance Series as well as Unreal Engine 4 for vastly improved graphics.

In March 2020 Reiza Studios released Automobilista 2, a successor to their popular Automobilista. The game features many cars from old F1 cars to trucks. The game also features both real and fictional tracks, many of the real tracks like Jerez and others get laser-scanned for a perfect recreation of the track. The game uses the madness engine, the same one used for Project CARS 2.

Relation to professional drivers
Following the cancellation of part of the 2020 Formula 1 season due to the COVID-19 pandemic, many F1 drivers such as George Russell, Lando Norris and Alexander Albon took part in Virtual Grand Prix, using the online features of the official game.

In his free time, 2021 and 2022 Formula One World Champion Max Verstappen enjoys sim racing. Having taken part in many sim racing competitions, Verstappen stated that it helps him with his real life racing, keeping him "ready to go". Verstappen is a member of Team Redline; a multinational sim racing team.

Online communities
In recent years as international interest has grown, so has the online community and underground racing circuit. These communities act as a focal point for users around the world to engage with one another co-ordinate racing schedules, exchange modded cars, tracks, discuss hardware configurations and facilitate other communications. Also the topic of E-Sports is ever growing in the sim racing community.

Ranked multiplayer

Some racing games have introduced a multiplayer driver ranking system for organizing online racing. There are usually two orthogonal types of driver rankings, one which ranks drivers according to how safe they are on track and with respect to other drivers in avoiding incidents, and one according to how fast they are. For the driver speed rating, an Elo rating system is typically used, as a form of matchmaking to group together drivers of similar skills. The safety rating instead is typically used as a form of licence which is required to access some classes of races.

Sim racing games that include some form of ranked online racing are iRacing (with iRating and safety rating), Gran Turismo Sport (with Driver Class and Sportsmanship Points), Project CARS 2 (Racecraft Ranking and Skill Rating), RaceRoom (with Reputation Rating and Rating), Gran Turismo 7, and Assetto Corsa Competizione. Other sims have similar systems under development, like Automobilista 2 and rFactor 2.

eSports 
The ranked games and sims also include an eSports division that shows off the high caliber drivers in each sim. Some sims have both special events and championships series that put those drivers on the big stage.

iRacing 
iRacing is home of the eNascar Coca Cola iRacing Series, Porsche TAG Heuer Esports Supercup, World of Outlaws series, and more. The Coca Cola series competes for 20 races in the 2023 season for a total purse of $300,000 with $100,000 going to the champion. Live broadcasts are featured on Twitch, YouTube, and Facebook.

Gran Turismo 7

In 2023  Gran Turismo 7 will be hosting the Olympic Esports Series, sanctioned by Fédération Internationale de l'Automobile.

See also
 Comparison of direct-drive sim racing wheels
 Full motion racing simulator
 List of driving and racing video games
 Racing game
 Vehicle simulation game
 Virtual reality simulator

References

 
Video game genres